Amorphophallus sylvaticus is a flowering plant species in India. This is used in herbal medicine.

Gallery

References

sylvaticus